Toma Tudoran (12 April 1903 – 1975) was a Romanian equestrian. He competed in two events at the 1936 Summer Olympics.

References

1903 births
1975 deaths
Romanian male equestrians
Olympic equestrians of Romania
Equestrians at the 1936 Summer Olympics
Sportspeople from Iași